Sholing railway station is a railway station serving the suburb of Sholing, on the edge of Southampton, England, operated by South Western Railway. It is the finishing point of the Itchen Way, a 32-mile long-distance footpath.

Upgrades 

In 2009 the station had stairs replaced and new CCTV cameras fitted. This followed an incident where a male fell down the stairs on Platform 2, breaking his leg.

Local campaigns have sought to see additional shelters installed at the station following increased usage which has doubled over the last six years.

Services 
South Western Railway operate all off-peak services at Sholing using  EMUs.

The typical off-peak service in trains per hour is:
 1 tph to 
 1 tph to 

References

Gallery

External links 

Railway stations in Southampton
Former London and South Western Railway stations
Railway stations in Great Britain opened in 1866
Railway stations served by South Western Railway
1866 establishments in England
Railway stations served by Govia Thameslink Railway